Seyed Mahdi Panzvan Langroudi (born 17 February 1981) is an Iranian weightlifter. He won the bronze medal in the Men's 62 kg weight class at the 1999 Asian Weightlifting Championships.

Major result

References

External links
 
 
  (archive)
 
 
 
 

Living people
1981 births
Iranian male weightlifters
Iranian strength athletes
Olympic weightlifters of Iran
Weightlifters at the 2000 Summer Olympics
Weightlifters at the 2004 Summer Olympics
Asian Games bronze medalists for Iran
Asian Games medalists in weightlifting
Weightlifters at the 1998 Asian Games
Weightlifters at the 2002 Asian Games
Weightlifters at the 2010 Asian Games
Medalists at the 1998 Asian Games
Medalists at the 2002 Asian Games
21st-century Iranian people